Medicspot (legal entity Medic Spot Limited) is a health technology company based in Hastings & London.  Its Arc Health software offers patients access to medical advice using equipment which can be operated by the patient in the pharmacy while communicating digitally with an online doctor.

Dr Zubair Ahmed is the co-founder. 

The Medicspot service was available from Pharmacydirect in Southampton and the A1 Pharmacy in Bolton from December 2019 for £39.   A scottish pharmacist reported that the one-stop-shop for healthcare had given them "a huge increase in footfall as well as an increase in profit by over £1,000 per month generated by Medicspot private prescriptions". 

It was installed in eleven care homes in Leicester and was said to have reduced consultation times from an hour to about 20 minutes.   It has partnered with EMIS Health.  EMIS Web will give it access to 57% of GP practices across England, permitting virtual ward rounds and minimising care home visits.  According to the company only 6% of consultations require a follow-up face-to-face consultation.  Connected Nottinghamshire, a programme set up by Nottingham Clinical Commissioning Group has adopted the technology in care homes.

In July 2020 the company started an in-store virtual general practitioner service in partnership with Asda.  It was launched at the Asda Supercentre in Stevenage.  Real-time diagnostics - a connected stethoscope, pulse oximeter, blood pressure monitor, contactless thermometer, and a close inspection camera - will be available in the pharmacy and patients can consult a GP remotely without the need to book an appointment in advance.  It was initially free, but after 4th July costs £49.

It was criticised as privatisation by the back door by Russ McLean, chairman of the Pennine Lancashire Patient Voices Group.

Not to be confused with Arc Health, Inc. of Berkeley, California.

References

Medical technology companies of the United Kingdom